Ulyunkhan is a rural locality (an ulus) in Kurumkansky District, Republic of Buryatia, Russia. The population was 678 as of 2010. There are 23 streets.

Geography 
Ulyunkhan is located 82 km northeast of Kurumkan (the district's administrative centre) by road. Yagdyg is the nearest rural locality.

References 

Rural localities in Kurumkansky District